The 2000 Auto Trader RAC British Touring Car Championship season featured 24 rounds across 12 meetings, it commenced at Brands Hatch on 9 April and concluded at Silverstone on 16 September.

2000 marked the final year for Super Touring specification cars in the championship. The champion was Alain Menu driving a Ford Mondeo, his teammates Anthony Reid and Rickard Rydell finished 2nd and 3rd respectively. The Michelin Cup for Independents was won by Matt Neal driving a Nissan Primera. 

The newly introduced Class B, for Super Production specification cars, was won by Alan Morrison driving a Peugeot 306 GTi.

Background

Driver changes

There were several changes of driver for the 2000 season. Nissan, Renault and Volvo retired their works teams because of the rising costs of staying competitive in the BTCC, thus leaving only three manufacturers with factory supported entries: Ford, Honda and Vauxhall. 1999 Drivers' Champion Laurent Aïello did not return to defend his title; the Frenchman tested for Honda, however he instead joined Audi to compete in the 24 Hours of Le Mans endurance race and the newly revived Deutsche Tourenwagen Masters championship in Germany. His place was taken by 1997 24 Hours of Le Mans co-winner and former Super Tourenwagen Cup driver Tom Kristensen. In the meantime, Peter Kox switched to competing in the European Super Touring Car Championship. Initially Honda planned to run two cars but to level the playing field with Ford and Vauxhall decided to draft in 1994 champion Gabriele Tarquini in a JAS Motorsport prepared car that originally would have been driven alongside Kox in the European championship.

1998 series champion Rickard Rydell joined that year's runner-up Anthony Reid and 1997 overall winner Alain Menu at the Prodrive Ford team following Volvo's departure. At the Vauxhall team, Yvan Muller was partnered by Jason Plato and Vincent Radermecker, having joined from Renault and Volvo respectively. After a difficult 1999 season, former double champion (1989 and 1995) John Cleland announced his retirement from the BTCC. Independent driver Matt Neal drove a 1999 Nissan Primera fielded by Team Dynamics, who had semi-works support from the manufacturer and running with updated 2000 body work. A second Nissan was entered by PRO Motorsport for rookie Colin Blair. David Leslie would race the car at selected rounds later in the season following Blair's withdrawal halfway through the season. Lee Brookes appeared on the entry list but his plans of competing in the championship in 2000 did not come to fruition.

Season review

The Prodrive Ford Mondeo’s would prove to be the class of the season, and it would be their three drivers who would battle for the championship.
Alain Menu had been the favourite going into the year, but despite being arguably the best all-rounder out of the trio, a handful of non-finishes meant he entered the final race of the year behind Anthony Reid in points.

Reid had had a somewhat quiet season, taking until round seventeen to win a race and only winning two all season. But he was easily the most consistent of the three and it allowed him to lead the points going into the final race. The Scot was doing all that he needed in the finale and looked to be on course for the title, until a collision with Vincent Radermecker on the penultimate lap put him out of the race and handed the crown to his colleague Menu.

Team newcomer Rickard Rydell also went to Silverstone with a chance of the title. The Swede claimed a season-best nine pole positions throughout the year, but a number of retirements, both crashes and mechanical, would ultimately prove to be his downfall. Indeed, it would be a car problem which would deny him a chance of competing with his teammates in the final race, as a water leak left him unable to take the start.

Vauxhall’s season started well, both Yvan Muller and Jason Plato won races early on and the Frenchman even lead the points for a while. But the team could not sustain that form, and along with an intra-team rivalry building between Muller and Plato, they were forced to settle for best of the rest behind the Fords. Third driver Radermecker had a poor season, scoring only one podium and being the only full-time main class driver to not win a race during the year.

Honda’s season would be one of frustration. James Thompson went into the season planning a title challenge, but those hopes were dashed by a crash at the opening round at Brands Hatch which forced him to miss the next two meetings. He would win a race on his return, but any hopes of the championship were gone, and come the end of the season he even found himself combining his British campaign with DTM drives for Audi.

The returning Gabriele Tarquini would ultimately end the season as top Honda, picking up three race wins but only finishing sixth in the standings.
British championship rookie Tom Kristensen would also end pick up three race wins, including a double at the Silverstone finale (the final races of the Super Touring era), to end the year just behind Tarquini.

Independent king Matt Neal would once again compete admirably with the works teams. He would finish eighth in the standings with a race win late in the season at Brands Hatch. He won the independents class in every race he finished (21 out of 24 races).

Regulation and sporting changes
Michelin, now the series' control tyre supplier, developed new compounds of tyres for the drivers but an intermediate option would no longer be available. The only choice for drivers was slick dry tyres or full wet compounds which meant tyre choices in greasy or changeable conditions were more crucial than before. To make matters even more difficult, tyre warmers were no longer allowed in advance of the race. As a result, the drivers had to take to the track on ill-handling cold tyres at the beginning of all races and after the mandatory pit stops. All teams were restricted to 28 sets of dry tyres for all race meetings and test sessions to lower operating costs but no limitations existed for wet-weather compounds.

Success ballast to help the championship have close and competitive racing and to prevent any team from dominating the series was introduced for the 2000 season. The top three finishers of the sprint and feature race at a meeting were allocated a ballast to be applied at the next meeting. No team was permitted to change the engine of their cars between the second qualifying session and the sprint race or the driver would incur a grid penalty that would see him start at the back of the grid. Also, replacement cars were not allowed except in force majeure when he would be allowed to drive his teammate's entry.

The points scoring system for the Drivers' and Teams' Championships remained unaltered from the 1999 championship. However, the Manufacturers' Championship was now limited to each team nominating a maximum of three cars for points, up from two from the previous season, to reward committed manufacturers. Furthermore, a dropped point score system was put into operation for the 2000 season. This meant all drivers would be required to drop their four worst results from the season before tallying his overall points haul.

From 1 March 2000, a complete ban of private testing at any licensed motor racing circuit in the world was enforced, except for official test sessions organised by the series promoter TOCA that lasted for half a day and were held before each race weekend. The ban was enacted to greatly reduce operating costs for all teams and to restrict the amount of available time for drivers to set up their cars for each track to ensure a greater variation in performance and less predictable racing. Furthermore, test cars were barred from all official sessions unless they had been driven in the preceding race meeting.

Class B 
The 2000 season saw the introduction of a type of car regulation called "Class B" to bolster the number of entrants on the grid. The class was open to all vehicles that complied with the FIA Super Production regulations and the National Saloon Championship. To allow for suitable grid sizes, Class B entries were accepted on a "first-come, first served" basis from teams who could commit to competing in the BTCC full-time. Class B was created as a consequence of a request to series promoters TOCA from potential competitors in the National Saloon Championship in December 1999 as a means of promoting themselves in a more visible national motor racing series. TOCA subsequently formed a partnership with the British Racing Drivers' Club-organised PowerTour series in January 2000, so that the two championships could work closely with race dates, regulations and marketing and promoting of Class B.

Other 
The entry fee for the Independents' Championship was abolished; teams would receive a starting money fee of £5,000 for each race meeting they entered, tyres would be given to teams at no extra cost and the champion of the category would receive £10,000 in prize money.

Entry List
The following 32 drivers and 14 teams took part in the 2000 British Touring Car Championship (BTCC).

Calendar
All races were held in the United Kingdom. A provisional 28-round calendar for the BTCC was officially announced on 28 July 1999. For the first time since the 1996 season, the series raced on the Brands Hatch Grand Prix layout and it served as the championship's season-opening meeting in April. Two meetings were held at night: the sole Snetterton Circuit round in July and the season-closing meeting at the Silverstone Circuit in mid-September. TOCA director Alan J. Gow explained that the advance publication of the calendar was so that the remaining British motorsport series could plain theirs but was told to reduce the number of rounds because of budgetary constraints for some teams.

In response, the management of the Thruxton Circuit agreed to forego its second planned meeting in August and lower the number of rounds to 26. Later, the Donington Park National circuit meeting, which had been proposed to be the season's second meeting on 23 April, was moved to late March to avoid a clash with the 2000 British Grand Prix but this decision was later reversed. The series' planned inaugural meeting in Ireland at Mondello Park was cancelled because the track needed improving to bring it to Fédération Internationale de l'Automobile (FIA) and TOCA standards, bringing the final number of rounds to 24.

Championship results tables

No driver may collect more than one "Lead a Lap" point per race no matter how many laps they lead.
Drivers' top 20 results count towards the championship.

Drivers Championship

Note: bold signifies pole position in class (1 point awarded all races), italics signifies fastest lap in class (1 point awarded all races) and * signifies that driver lead feature race for at least one lap (1 point given).

‡ Retired before second start of race

Independent's Championship

Manufacturers Championship

Touring Teams Championship

‡ Retired before second start of race

References

External links 
Official website of the British Touring Car Championship
BTCC Pages
Touring-Cars.net

2000 Season
Touring Car Championship Season